Return of the Boogie Men is the thirteenth studio album by British hard rock band Foghat, released in 1994. This album reunited the original members of the band, Dave Peverett, Roger Earl, Rod Price and Tony Stevens. Price had left the group after the completion of 1980's "Tight Shoes" release; Stevens had departed following the recording of "Rock and Roll Outlaws" in 1974. Beginning in June, 1994, Foghat toured through the end of 1996 to promote "Return of the Boogie Men". Two performances at the Roseland Theater in Portland, Oregon on October 25 and 26, 1996 were recorded which resulted in the 1998 live album, Road Cases.

Track listing
"Jump That Train" (Dave Peverett) - 5:16
"Louisiana Blues" (McKinley Morganfield) - 5:47
"Motel Shaker" (Nick Jameson, Peverett, Rod Price) - 4:39
"Play Dirty" (Peverett) - 5:02
"Nothin' but Trouble" (Peverett, Price) - 4:49
"Talk to Me Baby" (Robert Emmett Dolan, Elmore James) - 3:57
"I Just Want to Make Love to You" (Willie Dixon) - 4:17
"Take Me to the River" (Al Green, Mabon "Teenie" Hodges) - 5:14
"That's Alright Mama" (Arthur Crudup) - 4:17
"Feel So Good" (Big Bill Broonzy) - 3:03
"I Want You to Love Me" (Dixon, Muddy Waters) - 5:34
"Writing on the Wall" (Peverett, Price) - 4:28

 Tony Stevens – Bass, Backing Vocals 
 Rod Price – Lead Guitar, Slide Guitar, Guitar [Dobro], Backing Vocals 
 Lonesome Dave Peverett – Vocals, Guitar
 Roger Earl – drums

References

1994 albums
Foghat albums
Atlantic Records albums